Thirst for Love ( Ai no kawaki) is a 1967 Japanese drama film directed by Koreyoshi Kurahara, starring Nobuo Nakamura and Ruriko Asaoka. It is also known as Longing for Love and The Thirst for Love. It tells the story of a young widow who becomes the mistress of her wealthy father-in-law. The film is based on the novel Thirst for Love by Yukio Mishima.

Cast
 Nobuo Nakamura as Yakichi Sugimoto
 Ruriko Asaoka as Etsuko
 Akira Yamanouchi as Kensuke
 Yuko Kusunoki as Chieko
 Yoko Ozono as Asako
 Junko Shinami as Nobuko
 Takayuki Iwama as Natsuo
 Tetsuo Ishidate as Saburô
 Chitose Kurenai as Miyo

Reception
Fernando F. Croce wrote for Slant Magazine in 2011, when the film was released on DVD by The Criterion Collection: "Kurahara makes use of an ample arsenal of cinematic effects—abrupt disjunctions of sound and image, intertitles alternating with inner monologues, strategic flashes of lurid color following sudden bloodbaths—to visualize the voluptuous turmoil of Mishima’s avant-garde writing, all while exploring his own motifs of fears and desires churning under tidy surfaces."

References

External links
 Thirst for Love at The Criterion Collection's website

1967 drama films
1967 films
Films based on Japanese novels
Films based on works by Yukio Mishima
Films directed by Koreyoshi Kurahara
Japanese drama films
1960s Japanese films